The Merchants' and Drovers' Tavern is a historic tavern located in Rahway, Union County, New Jersey, United States. The tavern was added to the National Register of Historic Places on November 21, 1978. 

The exact construction dates of the building have been the source of some historical debate.  An analysis of samples of the building’s wooden frame conducted by Columbia University’s Lamont Dougherty Earth Sciences Observatory found that there were two distinct periods of construction – one in 1795–1796, then another in 1818–1819.  The claim that the building did not exist until 1795 at the earliest is further supported by the fact that the first innkeeper, John Anderson, did not receive a tavern license until 1798, after the initial period of construction.   It only began operation as a hotel around 1825, after the recent addition turned the two and a half story building into a three and a half story one.  

In the 1960s, the Rahway Historical Society formed and saved the historic building from destruction by purchasing it and transforming it into the center for historical interpretation that it is today.   The Museum is presently looked after by The Merchants and Drovers Tavern Museum Association.  Throughout most of the 2000s, the Tavern underwent significant restoration efforts.  In September 2021, the Museum announced on its website that the second phase of the Restoring Our Legacy Campaign has been completed and Phase III is underway.  Phase II saw the restoration of the second, third, and fourth floors of the building as well as the front facade. 

The tavern is adjacent to the Rahway Cemetery. The Merchants and Drovers Tavern Museum Association (MDTMA) runs historic tours and talks, including on the Victorian-era murder known as The Unknown Woman or Rahway Jane Doe.

In 2017, the cast of the hit paranormal reality series Ghost Hunters held a fundraiser for the museum.

See also 
 National Register of Historic Places listings in Union County, New Jersey
 Rahway River Parkway

References

External links
The Merchants and Drovers Tavern Museum

Buildings and structures in Union County, New Jersey
Commercial buildings completed in 1773
Drinking establishments on the National Register of Historic Places in New Jersey
National Register of Historic Places in Union County, New Jersey
Rahway, New Jersey
Museums in Union County, New Jersey
New Jersey Register of Historic Places
Taverns in New Jersey